Environmental issues in Pakistan include air pollution, water pollution, noise pollution, climate change, pesticide misuse, soil erosion, natural disasters, desertification and flooding. According to the 2020 edition of the environmental performance index (EPI) ranking released by Yale Center for Environmental Law & Policy, Pakistan ranks 142 with an EPI score of 33.1, an increase of 6.1 over a 10-year period. It ranked 180 in terms of air quality. The climatic changes and global warming are the most alarming issues risking millions of lives across the country. The major reasons of these environmental issues are carbon emissions, population explosion, and deforestation.

These are serious environmental problems that Pakistan is facing, and they are getting worse as the country's economy expands and the population grows. Although some NGOs and government departments have taken initiatives to stop environmental degradation, Pakistan's environmental issues still remain.

Economic consequences of environmental degradation 
The majority of Pakistan's industrial sectors, for example fishing and agriculture, which account for more than one-fourth of the output and two-fifths of employment in Pakistan, are highly dependent on the country's natural resources. Hence, in order to sustain economic growth there is a high demand on already scarce natural resources. However it is ironic that what the country depends on for its growth is also what threatens the future welfare and success of the country. According to the World Bank, 70% of Pakistan's population live in rural areas and are already stricken by high poverty levels. These people depend on natural resources to provide income and tend to overuse these resources. This leads to further degradation of the environment and subsequently increases poverty. This has led to what the World Bank refers to as a "vicious downward spiral of impoverishment and environmental degradation."

Pollution 

The World Bank report in 2013 stated that Pakistan's top environmental issues include air pollution, inadequate supply of uncontaminated drinking water, noise pollution and the health deterioration of urban and rural populations due to pollution. These environmental concerns not only harm Pakistani citizens but also pose a serious threat to the country's economy. The report also stated that the increase in industrialization, urbanization and motorization will inevitably worsen this problem.

Water pollution 

Pakistan is classified as a water stressed nation by the World Bank. There are seven main rivers that enter Pakistan from upper riparian states, including the Kabul River that enters from Afghanistan, and the Indus River, Jhelum River, Chenab River, Ravi River, and Sutlej River that enter from India. Among these, the Ravi and Sutlej are diverted in upstream India, for which consumptive use was awarded to India under the Indus Waters Treaty signed in 1960 by India and Pakistan. Canal networks from the Indus (main stem), Jhelum River, and Chenab River supply water throughout the agricultural plains in Punjab and in Sindh, while the rest of the country has very little access to other fresh water. Potential scarcity of water not only threatens Pakistan's economy but also poses a serious threat to the lives of millions of Pakistanis.

Lower flows due to the Indus Waters Treaty, as well as diversion to canals, means that lower dilution flows are available within the rivers of Pakistan. On the other hand, water pollution generation is increasing largely due to the growing economy and population, and an almost complete lack of water treatment. The sources for water pollution include the overuse of chemical fertilizers and pesticides, the dumping of industrial effluent into lakes and rivers, untreated sewage being dumped into rivers and the ocean, and contaminated pipelines being used to transport water. The contamination of fresh drinking water makes it harder for people to find clean water supplies and increases the prevalence of waterborne diseases. Consequently, most of the reported health problems in Pakistan are either a direct or indirect result of polluted water. 45% of infant deaths are due to diarrhea and 60% to overall waterborne diseases.

Noise pollution 
The megacities of Pakistan, such as Karachi, Lahore, Islamabad and Rawalpindi, face the issue of noise pollution. The main source of this pollution is the traffic noise caused by buses, cars, trucks, rickshaws and water tankers. A study showed that on one of Karachi's main roads, the average noise level was around 90 dB and was capable of reaching about 110 dB. This is much higher than the ISO's noise level standard of 70 dB, which is not meant to be harmful to the human ear. However, the study also concluded that in Pakistan, "the traffic noise levels limit as laid down by National Environment Quality standards, Environmental Protection Agency is 85 dB".

This high level of noise pollution can cause auditory and non-auditory health issues. Auditory issues include the loss of auditory sensory cells; non-auditory health issues include sleep disturbance, noise and cardiovascular disease, endocrine response to noise and psychiatric disorder. There are very few, vague laws and policies in regards to noise levels. There is no accountability, and while the federal and provincial environmental protection agencies receive dozens of complaints on noise pollution from the public, these agencies are unable to take action due to legal constraints and the absence of national noise level standards.

Air pollution 
Air pollution is a growing environmental problem in most major cities of Pakistan. According to a World Bank report, "Karachi's urban air pollution is among the most severe in the world and it engenders significant damages to human health and the economy". The inefficient use of energy, an increase in the number of vehicles used daily, an increase in unregulated industrial emissions and the burning of garbage and plastic have contributed the most to air pollution in urban areas. According to a recent study, the Sindh Environment Protection Department claims that the average level of pollution in big cities is approximately four times higher than the World Health Organisation's limits. These emissions have detrimental effects, including "respiratory diseases, reduced visibility, loss of vegetation and an effect on the growth of plants".

One of the greatest contributors to air pollution is industrial activity. The inadequate air emission treatments and lack of regulatory control over industrial activity has contributed to the deterioration of ambient air quality in major cities. In addition, the common practice of burning massive amounts of solid waste, including plastic and rubber, on street corners by the public, releases toxic gases, which are extremely harmful for residents in the area.

In 2018, a young entrepreneur in Karachi, Abid Omar, launched the Pakistan Air Quality Initiative to monitor air quality in Pakistan's big cities. The project aims to increase the availability of air quality data in Pakistan and make citizens more aware of the health impacts of air pollution. The US State Department has set up three high-quality air quality monitoring stations at three locations in Pakistan.

Specifically, studies have revealed the negative consequences air pollution can have on the welfare of those impacted. Studies have revealed how the constant fluctuation of particulate matter poses a major threat to Pakistan's citizens who are frequently exposes to harmful levels of air pollution. Suspended Particulate Matter, which has been linked to respiratory illnesses has been found in harmful quantities in Pakistan's major urban areas. Some strategies that can be used to effectively manage Pakistan's urban air pollution problems include the advancements to road design and improvement of transport sustainability, increased use of abatement policy by the Pakistani government, and a conversion to clean fuel energy alternatives like CNG.

Climate change

Natural disasters 

Due to Pakistan's diverse land and climatic conditions, it is prone to different forms of natural disasters, including earthquakes, floods, tsunamis, droughts, cyclones and hurricanes. A disaster management report claims that the provinces of Gilgit-Baltistan (GB), Balochistan and AJK are vulnerable seismic regions and hence highly susceptible to earthquakes, while Sindh and Punjab constantly suffer from floods because they are low-lying areas.

Some of the worst natural disasters that Pakistan has faced include the 1935 Quetta earthquake when around 60,000 people were killed, the 1950 floods when an estimated 2900 people died and 900,000 people were left homeless, the 1974 Hunza earthquake where around 5300 people were killed, the 2005 Kashmir earthquake that killed at least 73,000 and affected more than 1.5 million people, and the 2010 floods, where 20 million people were affected.

Forests 
Pakistan had a 2018 Forest Landscape Integrity Index mean score of 7.42/10, ranking it 41st globally out of 172 countries.

Conservation efforts

The government has expressed concern about environmental threats to economic growth and social development and since the early 1990s has addressed environmental concerns with new legislation and institutions such as the Pakistan Environment Protection Council. However, foreign lenders provide most environmental protection funds, and only 0.04 percent of the government's development budget goes to environmental protection. Thus, the government's ability to enforce environmental regulations is limited, and private industries often lack the funds to meet environmental standards established by international trade organizations. Government of Pakistan start new campaign with Clean and Green Pakistan to overcome environmental issues.

Clean Green Champion Program 
An initiative named Clean Green Pakistan was launched in 2019 by the Government of Pakistan. The idea of the initiative was to hold a competition between cities of Pakistan in cleanliness and greenery. A web portal was launched where citizens can get registered and report their activities to earn points. Citizens would also be awarded medals when they reach a certain threshold of points.

Billion Tree Tsunami 
The Billion Tree Tsunami was launched in 2014 by the government of Khyber Pakhtunkhwa (KPK) as a response against the challenge of global warming. Pakistan's Billion Tree Tsunami restores 350,000 hectares of forests and degraded land to surpass its Bonn Challenge commitment. The project aimed at improving the ecosystems of classified forests, as well as privately owned waste and farm lands, and therefore entails working in close collaboration with concerned communities and stakeholders to ensure their meaningful participation through effectuating project promotion and extension services. In just a year it has added three-quarters of a billion new trees, as part of a “tree tsunami” aimed at reversing worsening forest loss. The project was completed in August 2017, ahead of schedule.

The initiative was acknowledged by international media, namely The Washington Post, VoA News, The Hindu, Reuters, Al Jazeera, and many others. Short films such as Green Election Campaign and Stop are a part of Clean Green Pakistan Effort.

National Conservation Strategy
The Conservation Strategy Report has three explicit objectives: conservation of natural resources, promotion of sustainable development, and improvement of efficiency in the use and management of resources. It sees itself as a "call for action" addressed to central and provincial governments, businesses, non-governmental organizations (NGOs), local communities, and individuals.

The primary agricultural nonpoint source pollutants are nutrients (particularly nitrogen and phosphorus), sediment, animal wastes, pesticides, and salts. Agricultural nonpoint sources enter surface water through direct surface runoff or through seepage to ground water that discharges to a surface water outlet. Various farming activities result in the erosion of soil particles. The sediment produced by erosion can damage fish habitat and wetlands, and often transports excess agricultural chemicals resulting in contaminated runoff. This runoff, in turn, affects changes to aquatic habitat such as temperature increases and decreased oxygen. The most common sources of excess nutrients in surface water from nonpoint sources are chemical fertilizers and manure from animal facilities. Such nutrients cause eutrophication in surface water. Pesticides used for pest control in agricultural operations can also contaminate surface as well as ground-water resources. Return flows, runoff, and leach ate from irrigated lands may transport sediment, nutrients, salts, and other materials. Finally, improper grazing practices in riparian areas, as well as upland areas, can also cause water quality degradation. The development of Pakistan is viewed as a multigenerational enterprise.

In seeking to transform attitudes and practices, the National Conservation Strategy recognizes that two key changes in values are needed: the restoration of the conservation ethic derived from Islamic moral values, called Qantas, and the revival of community spirit and responsibility, Haqooq ul Ibad.

The National Conservation Strategy Report recommends fourteen program areas for priority implementation: maintaining soils in croplands, increasing efficiency of irrigation, protecting watersheds, supporting forestry and plantations, restoring rangelands and improving livestock, protecting water bodies and sustaining fisheries, conserving biodiversity, increasing energy efficiency, developing and deploying renewable resources, preventing or decreasing pollution, managing urban wastes, supporting institutions to manage common resources, integrating population and environmental programs, and preserving the cultural heritage. It identifies sixty-eight specific programs in these areas, each with a long-term goal and expected outputs and physical investments required within ten years. Special attention has been paid to the potential roles of environmental NGOs, women's organizations, and international NGOs in working with the government in its conservation efforts. Recommendations from the National Conservation Strategy Report are incorporated in the Eighth Five-Year Plan (1993–98).

In a recent study conducted by the Global CLEAN campaign, it was found that the average temperature in Pakistan had risen by 0.2 degrees in only two years. This is a dramatic change and puts emphasis on climate change campaigns.

Land use
 Arable land - 27%
 Permanent crops - 1%
 Permanent pastures - 6%
 Forests and woodland - 5%
 Other - 61% (1993 est.)
 Irrigated land - 171,100 km2 (1993 est.)

Protected areas

Pakistan has 14 national parks, 72 wildlife sanctuaries, 66 game reserves, 9 marine and littoral protected areas, 19 protected wetlands and a number of other protected grasslands, shrublands, woodlands and natural monuments.

International agreements
Pakistan is a party to several international agreements related to environment and climate. The most prominent among them are:

See also
 Green economy
 Geography of Pakistan
 Health care in Pakistan
 Hydrogen economy
 Leapfrogging from natural gas to hydrogen
 List of environmental issues
 Pakistan Environmental Protection Agency
 Protected areas of Pakistan
 Wildlife of Pakistan

References

External links
 Environment Protection Agency, Pakistan
 Resources on Pakistan, Environment and Sustainable Development